New Brighton (sometimes ) is a small village in Flintshire, in north-east Wales. It lies between the towns of Mold and Buckley, in the community of Argoed.

New Brighton lies on the A5119 road and has a hotel, the Beaufort Park Hotel.

A New Brighton electoral ward exists, formed from the northern half of the Argoed community, with a total population taken at the 2011 census of 3,001.

Some residents refer to it by its Welsh name Pentre Cythraul, though the Welsh name was not recognised by the Welsh Language Commissioner in 2018, causing local people to ask for this to be reviewed.

References

Villages in Flintshire
Wards of Flintshire